School District 78 Fraser-Cascade is a school district in the eastern Fraser Valley of British Columbia. It includes Harrison Hot Springs, the District of Kent, including Agassiz, and extends up the Fraser River from there to the town of Hope and up the southern section of the Fraser Canyon along Highway 1 to the communities of Yale and Boston Bar.

History

School district 78 was formed in 1996 by the merging of School District No. 32 (Hope) and School District No. 76 (Agassiz-Harrison).

Schools

See also
List of school districts in British Columbia

Lower Mainland
78